The Golden Ratio is the fifth studio album by Swedish pop music group Ace of Base. It was recorded in early 2009 through mid-2010. It is the only album to feature two new vocalists: Clara Hagman and Julia Williamson.  Production on this album initially began with former band member and lead vocalist, Jenny Berggren in which the resulting sessions were shelved.

The Golden Ratio marks the band's first album of completely new material since their 2002 album, Da Capo. The album entered the German album charts at number 20 and at number 100 in Switzerland.

Background

The band have said of the album “The Golden Ratio” is the end result of three years of work in the studio for Ulf and Jonas. Their main challenge was to find what the Ace of Base sound would be in the second decade of the twenty-first century. After a year of experimenting, they realized they wanted to embrace and preserve the original Ace of Base sound and make it contemporary at the same time." Following the release of the album, an acoustic version was in talks but never eventuated.

Singles
The sole single released from the album was "All for You". The song was serviced to European radio stations in mid-July 2010, and was released as a single in digital and physical formats on September 10, 2010. The music video for the song was released on August 27, 2010.

Promotional 
"Mr. Replay" was released as the first promotional single from the album prior to its release and was the first Ace of Base release to feature Clara and Julia. The song appeared on a promotional DJ disc which was released in early July 2010. "Mr. Replay" was described as an "amalgamation of every song Ace of Base has ever recorded" and features guest vocals on verses by Lex Marshall. The song received mixed reviews from critics, who felt it was too similar to their previous material. The song appears in a slightly different format on the album in comparison with the promotional release.

The title track from The Golden Ratio was planned as a future single in Sweden; however, it was only released promotionally and was the final release from the album.

Reception
The Golden Ratio received mostly positive reviews from critics. Rock&Review gave the album a positive review, stating, "Sonically, The Golden Ratio is everything you expect in an Ace of Base album and it's quite hard to tell that Jonas Berggren's sisters are absent as the new vocalists do a great job of filling in where Malin and Jenny left off."

ScandiPop also gave the album very high praise, saying "It’s a jaw droppingly good album. They’ve gone back to everything that made them so brilliant when they first started out in the early nineties."

Track listing

 "The Sign" on this record refers to Jonas Berggren and Ulf Ekberg as a production team.

Charts

References

External links
Ace of Base official web site

Ace of Base albums
2010 albums